Indonesia participated in the 1998 Asian Games held in the city of Bangkok, Thailand from 6 December 1998 to 20 December 1998. Indonesia ranked 11th with 6 gold medals. 10 silver medals, and 11 bronze medals in this edition of the Asiad.

Medal summary

Medal table

Medalists

References

Nations at the 1998 Asian Games
1998
Asian Games